Kinama is the name of several settlements in Burundi:

Kinama, Bubanza
Kinama, Bujumbura
Kinama, Bururi
Kinama, Cibitoke
Kinama, Gitega	
Kinama, Kayanza
Kinama, Muyinga